The 1966 Arkansas State Indians football team represented Arkansas State College—now known as Arkansas State University—as a member of the Southland Conference during the 1966 NCAA College Division football season. Led by fourth-year head coach Bennie Ellender, the Indians compiled an overall record of 7–2 with a mark of 2–2 in conference play, tying for third place in the Southland.

Schedule

References

Arkansas State
Arkansas State Red Wolves football seasons
Arkansas State Indians football